Ralph Carlyle "Red" Maddox (September 28, 1908 – November 16, 1944) was an American college football player and U.S. Army captain.

College football
Maddox was an All-Southern guard for the Georgia Bulldogs of the University of Georgia. The other guard for the team was also nicknamed "Red"–Milton Leathers. Maddox was a member of the 1929 team which defeated Yale at Sanford Stadium. Former Georgia publicist Dan McGill uncovered information that indicated that Maddox had made the International News Service All-America team in 1930. However, this honor had never been recorded in Maddox's lifetime. The 1931 team lost just two games. One to national champion USC and the team which USC beat in the Rose Bowl, Tulane.

Army
Maddox was a U.S. Army captain who died while serving in World War II.

References

1908 births
1944 deaths
Georgia Bulldogs football players
All-Southern college football players
American football guards
Players of American football from Georgia (U.S. state)
All-American college football players
People from Douglas, Georgia
United States Army personnel killed in World War II
United States Army officers